Joaquín Maurín Juliá (Catalan: Joaquim Maurín, 12 January 1896 – 5 November 1973) was a Spanish communist politician and activist. The leader of the Workers and Peasants Bloc (BOC) and of the Workers' Party of Marxist Unification (POUM), he was active mainly in Catalonia.

Early life
Born in Bonansa in Huesca, Aragon, Maurín engaged in socialist politics from early youth and stood trial on several occasions.

CNT and Profintern
After law studies, he practiced in Lleida (Catalonia), where he became affiliated with the anarchist  Confederación Nacional del Trabajo (CNT, "National Confederation of Labour"). In 1920, Joaquín Maurín was elected local secretary for the trade union, as well as the editor of its weekly Lucha Social. In 1921, he represented the movement at the Profintern Congress in Moscow, the capital of Soviet Russia. Upon his return, he was elected general secretary of the CNT shortly before was arrested and detained in February 1922. After his release, Maurín founded the Comités Sindicalistas Revolucionarios ("Revolutionary Trade Union Committees") as a Bolshevik group within the CNT. He also gave the committees their own press tribune, La Batalla, in December.

Communist Party of Spain
In 1924, he led his La Batalla into a merger with the Communist Party of Spain and took charge of organising the latter's local wing, the Catalan-Balearic Communist Federation (FCCB). During the crackdown on opposition parties that was ordered by the dictator Miguel Primo de Rivera, Maurín was arrested and jailed in January 1925. Released in 1927, he opted to leave Spain for Paris. However, he returned to Barcelona in 1930 and worked for the reanimation of La Batalla in the months before the proclamation of the Second Spanish Republic in early 1931. He became opposed to Stalinist policies in the Soviet Union and took a stand that saw him grouped with the emergent international Right Opposition. He split with the Communist Party of Spain and led the FCCB into independent politics. (His wing's place in the Stalinist body was quickly taken over by the Communist Party of Catalonia.)

BOC and POUM
On 1 March 1931, the FCCB joined with the Catalan Communist Party and, in 1933, became the Iberian Communist Federation and declared its goal to occupy a place on the national stage. The unified body of the FCCB and the Catalan Communist group became the mass front Workers and Peasants Bloc (BOC), with Maurín as its general secretary. The party was to reach a dominant position in Catalonia.

During the riots provoked by the centrist stance of the Alejandro Lerroux government in 1934, Maurín advocated the forming of united front Alianzas Obreras ("Workers' Alliances") throughout Spain (following a pattern that was proving its force in the Asturias). With the indecisive end of the movements, his party opened itself to an alliance with Andreu Nin’s Trotskyist Communist Left of Spain. The merger was carried out in September 1935, when the two groups formed the POUM and Maurín elected its general secretary.

In line with his views on unified workers' action, the POUM joined the Spanish Popular Front in the runup for the elections of February 1936. Maurín was elected to the Spanish Congress of Deputies on Popular Front lists.

Capture and exile
With the Spanish coup of July 1936 and the start of the Spanish Civil War, Maurín found himself in Francoist Galicia. Attempting to escape through Aragon, he was captured in Jaca. His case came up for trial only in 1944, when he was sentenced to 30 years. However, he was detained until October 1, 1946, when he was paroled under an amnesty for some political prisoners, but confined to Madrid where he worked as a translator.

A witness to both the rise of Francoist Spain and the crushing of the POUM by Stalinist forces, in 1947 he took exile to the United States with his close family. There he created his own press agency and published his writings. Maurín died in New York City.

Notes

Further reading

 Andrew Durgan, BOC 1930-1936: El Bloque Obrero y Campesino (BOC 1930-1936: The Workers' and Peasants' Bloc). Barcelona: Laertes S.A. de Ediciones, 1996.
 Andrew Durgan, Dissident Communism in Catalonia, 1930-36. PhD dissertation. University of London, 1989.
 Antoni Monreal, El pensamiento político de Joaquín Maurín (The Political Thought of Joaquín Maurín'). Barcelona: Península, 1984.
 Alan Sennett, Revolutionary Marxism in Spain, 1930-1937. [2014] Chicago: Haymarket Books, 2015.

External links
Joaquín Maurín biography by Pedro Bonet y Luis Alonso at the Fundación Andreu Nin (in Spanish)
Joaquin Maurin archive at Stanford University
Joaquín Maurín archive at Marxists Internet Archive
Joaquín Maurín archive at Marxists Internet Archive (in Spanish)

1896 births
1973 deaths
People from Ribagorza
Communist Party of Spain politicians
Workers and Peasants' Bloc politicians
POUM politicians
Members of the Congress of Deputies of the Second Spanish Republic
Politicians from Aragon
Secretaries General of the Confederación Nacional del Trabajo
Right Opposition
Spanish people of the Spanish Civil War (Republican faction)
20th-century Spanish journalists